The 2013–14 IRB Sevens World Series, known for sponsorship reasons as the HSBC Sevens World Series, was the 15th annual series of rugby union sevens tournaments for full national sides. The IRB Sevens World Series has been run by the International Rugby Board since 1999–2000.

Itinerary

Core teams
For each season, there are 15 "core teams" that receive guaranteed berths in all events for that season's series. These teams were either placed in the top 12 of the standings before the 2013 London Sevens, or qualified during the World Series Core Team Qualifier held as part of the London Sevens. All 15 core teams from the 2012–13 season retained their core team status. The 2013–14 core teams were:

Changes to core team qualifying
On 9 October 2013, the IRB announced significant changes to the promotion/relegation process.

First, only one promotion place was available for the 2014–15 series. Also, the World Series Pre-Qualifier, which was a 12-team tournament contested as part of the 2013 Hong Kong Sevens, was folded into the Core Team Qualifier, which involved 12 teams and was entirely contested at the Hong Kong Sevens. The bottom-placed core team at the end of the season will now be automatically relegated, with no opportunity to retain core status.

The remaining three core teams for 2013–14 were determined in a two-stage qualifying process:
 The first stage was a World Series Qualifier held as part of the Hong Kong Sevens. Two qualifiers from each of the IRB's six regions competed. The 12 teams were drawn into pools, with the top eight teams advancing to a quarterfinal round. The winners of the four quarterfinal matches advanced to the final qualifying stage.
 The final qualifying stage, the World Series Core Team Qualifier, was held as part of the London Sevens. The qualifying teams were joined by the winner of the HSBC Asian Sevens Series, plus the bottom three core teams following the Scotland Sevens. The qualifying tournament was conducted with a pool stage followed by knockout play, with the two finalists and the winner of the third-place match becoming core teams for the following season.

Standings
The final standings after completion of the nine tournaments of the series are shown in the table below.

The points awarded to teams at each tournament, as well as the overall season totals, are shown. Points for the event winners are indicated in bold. A zero (0) is recorded in the event column where a team competed in a tournament but did not gain any points. A dash (–) is recorded in the event column if a team did not compete at a tournament.

Source:  

{| class="wikitable" style="font-size:92%;"
|-
!colspan=2| Legend
|- style="line-height:18px; font-size:90%;"
|colspan=2 align=center |Qualification for the 2014–15 World Sevens Series
|-
|No colour
|Core team in 2013–14 and re-qualified as a core team for the 2014–15 World Rugby Sevens Series
|-
|bgcolor=ffcccc|Pink
|Relegated as the lowest placed core team at the end of the 2013–14 Series
|-
|bgcolor=ffffcc|Yellow
|Invited team
|}

Player statistics

Points scored

Tries scored

Tournaments

Gold Coast

Dubai

South Africa

United States

Wellington

Japan

Hong Kong

Scotland

London

References

External links

 
World Rugby Sevens Series